Bethan Davies (born 7 November 1990) is a British racewalker who competes in the 20 kilometres walk event. She was the bronze medallist at the 2018 Commonwealth Games and has represented her country at the World Championships in Athletics and IAAF World Race Walking Team Championships. She holds the indoor British record in the 3000 metres walk (12:44.99 minutes) and the Commonwealth record for the indoor 5000 metres walk (21:25.37 minutes).

Born in Cardiff, she studied neuroscience at the University of Leeds and ran cross country for the varsity team. She began racewalking after filling in for her team in the event and had the opportunity to compete against elite walker Johanna Jackson. She began training and learning the sport under coach Andi Drake.

She broke through at national level in 2012, winning the British under-20 title in the 10,000 metres walk before placing third at the 2012 British Athletics Championships in the 5000 m distance. Davies won that title the following year at the 2013 British Athletics Championships and also made her debut over 20 km, making her international debut at the 2013 European Race Walking Cup and placing third in the 20 km national championship. She missed most of the 2014 season, but returned in 2015 with runner-up placings nationally over 5000 m and 20 km. She won national titles indoors and outdoors  in 2016, though she failed to finish the 20 km races at the 2016 IAAF World Race Walking Team Championships and the Dudinská Päťdesiatka.

Davies had a breakthrough in the 2017 season. She won the 5000 m walk at the 2017 British Athletics Championships then represented Great Britain at the 2017 European Race Walking Cup (finishing 22nd) and at the 2017 World Championships in Athletics held in London, where she ranked 29th overall. She described the latter experience as her best ever, having the home crowd cheer her on and call out her name. She also finished sixth at the Oceania Race Walking Championships, taking part as a guest.

International competitions

National titles
British Athletics Championships
5000 m walk: 2013, 2016, 2017
British Indoor Athletics Championships
3000 m walk: 2016
5000 m walk: 2018

References

External links
 
 European Athletics profile
 
 

1990 births
Living people
Sportspeople from Cardiff
British female racewalkers
Welsh female racewalkers
British female cross country runners
Welsh female cross country runners
Commonwealth Games bronze medallists for Wales
Commonwealth Games medallists in athletics
Athletes (track and field) at the 2018 Commonwealth Games
World Athletics Championships athletes for Great Britain
British Athletics Championships winners
Alumni of the University of Leeds
Medallists at the 2018 Commonwealth Games